Komkrit Camsokchuerk (born April 20, 1989), simply known as Nueng is a Thai professional footballer who plays as a centre back for Thai League 2 club Kasetsart.

Club career

External links
 Profile at Goal
 

1989 births
Living people
Komkrit Camsokchuerk
Komkrit Camsokchuerk
Association football central defenders
Komkrit Camsokchuerk
Komkrit Camsokchuerk
Komkrit Camsokchuerk
Komkrit Camsokchuerk
Komkrit Camsokchuerk
Komkrit Camsokchuerk
Komkrit Camsokchuerk
Komkrit Camsokchuerk